Hoplodoris armata is a species of sea slug, a dorid nudibranch, a marine gastropod mollusc in the family Discodorididae''.

Distribution
This species is recorded from Japan and South Korea.

References

  McDonald, G. R. (2009). Nudibranch Systematic Index, second edition. University of California Santa Cruz: Institute of Marine Sciences

Discodorididae
Gastropods described in 1993